A deep fried egg is an egg dish consisting of an egg that has been deep fried. Sometimes the dish is prepared only using the egg yolk, which is referred to as the deep fried egg yolk. Various types of eggs can be used to prepare the deep fried egg, such as chicken, duck and quail eggs. The dish is sometimes served alone, and is also used as an ingredient for various dishes. The dish is sometimes prepared using pre-cooked eggs that are breaded and deep fried.

Overview
A typical deep fried egg preparation involves cracking eggs directly into a container of heated cooking oil and then continuously spooning the egg white around the yolk to keep the yolk covered. Another method involves using two cooking spoons to continuously roll the egg in the oil after the egg white spooning process, which can assist in creating a consistent shape and coloration. As the egg cooks, the egg white transforms into a crunchy, hardened crust that surrounds the egg yolk. It is sometimes seasoned, such as with salt and pepper. 

The deep fried egg yolk is sometimes prepared using breading on the yolk, which is then deep fried. When breaded, the surface of the dish is crunchy, and the interior is molten, soft and creamy. It is sometimes served as an appetizer. 

The dish can also be prepared using pre-cooked eggs, such as poached or boiled eggs that are then deep fried. Sometimes the pre-cooked eggs are then coated in breading before the deep frying.

Deep fried eggs are served alone and also used as a topping for dishes, such as salads. Deep fried eggs are an ingredient in the Indonesian dish balado tahu telor, which consists of deep fried eggs, deep fried tofu and chili peppers.

Deep fried egg dishes

The deep fried egg is a popular dish in Asia. Tokneneng is a tempura-like Filipino street food made by deep-frying orange batter covered hard-boiled chicken or duck eggs. Kwek-kwek is a Filipino street food consisting of orange-battered and deep fried quail eggs.

Deep fried balut consists of a fertilized developing egg embryo that is boiled with the shell on and then deep fried. It is sometimes served on a stick in the Philippines.

Son-in-law eggs (Thai: kai look keuy) is a Thai dish prepared using deep fried hard boiled eggs and a sweet and sour caramel sauce. It is a relatively common street food in Thailand. In Thai folklore, some sources state that the dish is served as a warning to a mother's son-in-law who is mistreating his wife, or as a warning to a future son-in-law to not mistreat his wife, in which the dish is served to the son-in-law, with the eggs symbolically representing fried testicles.

Prepared deviled eggs can be deep fried and served as a hot dish.

Hazards
Preparation of this dish can be "rather dangerous", because when raw cracked eggs are dropped into hot oil, the oil can significantly erupt and splatter onto the cook or onto a hot stove burner, causing serious burns and potentially a fire as well. Preparing the dish using pre-cooked poached eggs that are then well-drained of water can be a safer means of preparation.

See also

 List of deep fried foods
 List of egg dishes

Notes

References

Further reading

External links
 
 

Deep fried foods
Egg dishes
Philippine cuisine